"Blame It on Me" is the second single from American soul–R&B singer–songwriter Chrisette Michele's second studio album, Epiphany. It was released to radio on May 12, 2009. The second single was originally scheduled to be "What You Do" featuring label-mate Ne-Yo, but was changed at the last minute.

Critical reception 
Mariel Concepcion of Billboard Magazine says "Chrisette pours her silky vocals atop hollow drums and slinky piano strokes on the breakup song "Blame It on Me."

The Koalition comments on how "Blame It on Me" showcases Ms. Michele and arguably her best vocal performance on the album as she takes the blame and responsibility for a failed relationship even though the two tried their hardest to make it work.

Charts

Weekly charts

Year-end charts

References 

2009 singles
Chrisette Michele songs
Songs written by Claude Kelly
Songs written by Chuck Harmony
Song recordings produced by Chuck Harmony
2009 songs
Songs written by Chrisette Michele
Contemporary R&B ballads
Soul ballads
2000s ballads